The S2W reactor was a naval reactor used by the United States Navy to provide electricity generation and propulsion on warships.  The S2W designation stands for:

 S = Submarine platform
 2 = Second generation core designed by the contractor
 W = Westinghouse was the contracted designer

History 

As installed in Nautilus it generated . It was originally designated STR.

USS Nautilus 
Nautilus was powered by the Submarine Thermal Reactor (STR), later redesignated the S2W reactor, a pressurized water reactor produced for the US Navy by Westinghouse Electric Corporation. Bettis Atomic Power Laboratory, operated by Westinghouse, developed the basic reactor plant design used in Nautilus after being given the assignment on 31 December 1947 to design a nuclear power plant for a submarine.

After Nautilus was decommissioned, the reactor equipment was removed.  The submarine is now moored and displayed as a museum ship at the Naval Submarine Base New London in Groton, Connecticut.

Variant 
After the predictable problems arose with the S2G's use of 347 Stainless Steel caused by the sodium in the liquid sodium reactor in its superheater the  had her S2G liquid metal cooled reactor replaced using the spare S2W built for USS Nautilus. During the conversion, the steam turbines in the powerplant were also re-bladed to utilize saturated, rather than superheated, steam. This reactor was designated S2Wa.

References

Notes

Bibliography 

United States naval reactors